Mylène Gilbert-Dumas (born October 20, 1967) is a Canadian writer living in the Estrie region of Quebec.

She was born in Sherbrooke, Quebec and received a bachelor's degree in French language instruction (secondary school) from Laval University. She taught French in an English school in Quebec for 12 years before returning to Sherbrooke in 2005.

In 2009, she was writer-in-residence at Berton House Writer's Retreat in Dawson City. Gilbert-Dumas was also a finalist for a Mr. Christie's Book Award in 2004 for her book for young adults Mystique.

Selected works 
 Les dames de Beauchêne, historical fiction - three volumes (2002–2005)
 Lili Klondike, historical fiction - three volumes (2008–2009)
 Détours sur la route de Compostelle, novel (2014)

References 

1967 births
Living people
Canadian novelists in French
Canadian women novelists
Université Laval alumni
Writers from Sherbrooke